Cantius frugivorus is a species of adapiform primate that lived in North America during the early Eocene.

Morphology
The incisors are small and vertical  in Cantius frugivorus, and the canines are prominent. The mandibular symphysis is unfused and this was most likely a diurnal species.

Diet
Based on the dental morphology of Cantius frugivorus, it most likely had a frugivorous diet.

Locomotion
The limb bones of Cantius frugivorus suggest it moved by arboreal quadrupedalism and leaping.

References

External links 
 Fleagle, J.G. 1999. Primate Adaptation and Evolution. Academic Press: San Diego.
 http://www.talkorigins.org/pdf/faq-transitional.pdf
 Mikko's Phylogeny Archive

Prehistoric strepsirrhines
Prehistoric primate genera
Eocene primates
Ypresian life
Wasatchian
Eocene mammals of North America
Paleontology in Colorado
Paleontology in New Mexico
Paleontology in North Dakota
Paleontology in Wyoming
Fossil taxa described in 1875